The 1638 New Hampshire earthquake struck central New Hampshire on June 1, 1638 (Julian calendar). It was the first major earthquake to strike New England following the start of European colonization. Modern analysis places its epicenter somewhere near what is now central New Hampshire, with an estimated magnitude between 6.0 and 7.0 . This makes it the largest earthquake on record in New Hampshire and New England, and the second strongest in northeastern North America after the 1663 Charlevoix earthquake.

See also
1755 Cape Ann earthquake
List of historical earthquakes

References

External links
 Earthquakes in New Hampshire Data (1638–1973) at Dartmouth College Library

1638 earthquakes
Earthquakes in New Hampshire
1638 in the Thirteen Colonies